Haggerty Hill is a mostly ice-free peak,  high, standing  southeast of Salmon Hill and immediately north of the snout of Salmon Glacier, on the Scott Coast of Victoria Land, Antarctica. It was named in 1992 by the Advisory Committee on Antarctic Names after Patrick R. Haggerty of Holmes and Narver, Inc., who managed logistics and construction activities at McMurdo Station, South Pole Station, Siple Station and various field camps during the 1970s and 1990s. He introduced female construction workers to the U.S. Antarctic Program for the first time during the 1978–79 season, and implemented computer based construction scheduling in the 1990s.

References

Mountains of Victoria Land
Scott Coast